Zinc finger and SCAN domain containing 4 is a protein that in humans is encoded by the ZSCAN4 gene.

Function

The ZSCAN4 gene encodes a protein involved in telomere maintenance and with a key role in the critical feature of mouse embryonic stem cells, namely, defying cellular senescence and maintaining normal karyotype for many cell divisions in culture.

References

Further reading